Reggada is a Moroccan Berber musical genre and traditional war dance from Beni Znassen/Aït Iznasen tribes of north-east Morocco (Provinces of Oujda, Berkane and Taourirt).

It is very similar to the Allaoui musical genre native to eastern Morocco, that arose around the same time as Reggada.

History 
Aït Iznasen Berber tribes  have traditional war dance and music after victory over the enemy, and thus the use of weapons and foot strikes in the rhythm of music.

Location 
Reggada music is published in the vicinity of the north east regions of Morocco, especially in the city of Aïn Regadda in Berkane Province .  It is popular in provinces such as : Oujda, Berkane, Taourirt, Nador, Al Hoceima, Taza, Ben Taieb etc.

Dance and music 
The dance is characterised with the masters (locally called sheikhs). These masters play music and dance using several traditional instruments such as Bendri, Ghaita and Zmmar which is a kind of flute with two horns typically found in Africa. The dancers move their shoulders, a rifle or a stick and strike the groin against the floor to the rhythm of drums.

The music often tells stories about topics such as love, emotions of sadness and happiness. From the late 1980s, music synthesizer are increasingly widely used.

References 

Moroccan music